Vasily Vitalyevich Shulgin (13 January 1878 – 15 February 1976) was a Russian conservative monarchist, politician and member of the White movement.

Young years
Shulgin was born in Kyiv. His father was a Professor of history, monarchist and editor of a monarchist newspaper. Shulgin studied at the Law faculty of Kiev University and was disgusted with the constant students' protests. At that time he became an ardent opponent of a revolution and supported the monarchy. He began to write articles in his father's newspaper. He also held antisemitic views but opposed open violence such as the notorious pogroms which were common in Kiev at the time. Later, in 1913, he heavily criticised the government for the Beilis trial. Shulgin understood that participation in or turning a blind eye on the most odious manifestation of antisemitism was detrimental to the government.

Politician

In 1907 Shulgin became a member of the Duma. He advocated right-wing views, supported the government of Pyotr Stolypin, including introduction of courts-martial, and other controversial changes. When the First World War broke out, Shulgin joined the army. In 1915 he was wounded and returned home. Shulgin was shocked by the inefficient organization and supply of the Russian army. Together with members of the Octobrists, the Cadets, and other right-wing or centrist politicians he established the Progressive Bloc. The aim of the Bloc was to provide the army with everything necessary since the government failed to do it.

Revolution and emigration
Obviously, Shulgin opposed the revolution, though it was evident that absolute monarchy in Russia would no longer exist. Together with Alexander Guchkov he persuaded Nicholas II to abdicate the throne since he believed that a constitutional monarchy  with Michael Alexandrovich being the monarch was possible, and that this or even a republic, if a strong government was established, would be a remedy for Russia. For the same reason he supported the Provisional Government and Kornilov's coup. 

When all hope was lost he moved to Kiev, and then the Kuban, where he participated in the White movement. During his time in Kiev, he published a newspaper called The Citizen of Kiev which supported the Whites and spread anti-Semitic conspiracies about the Bolsheviks, leading to a pogrom in Kiev. In 1920 Shulgin emigrated to Yugoslavia. In 1925-26 he secretly visited the Soviet Union. He described this visit and his impression of the New Economic Policy in the book called The Three Capitals (Три столицы). While in emigration Shulgin continued keeping in touch with other leaders of the White movement until 1937 when he ceased his political activity.

Return to the Soviet Union

In 1944 the Soviet army entered Yugoslavia. Shulgin was arrested and sentenced to 25 years for his "hostile to communism antisoviet activity". After twelve years in prison he was released in 1956 under the amnesty. Since then he lived in Vladimir. In his later books he argued that communism was no more a disaster for Russia since former Bolsheviks turned into patriots of Russia. In 1965 Shulgin was the main character of Fridrikh Ermler's documentary film The Verdict of History in which he told his story to a Soviet historian.

References

1878 births
1976 deaths
Politicians from Kyiv
People from Kievsky Uyezd
Monarchists from the Russian Empire
Members of the 2nd State Duma of the Russian Empire
Members of the 3rd State Duma of the Russian Empire
Members of the 4th State Duma of the Russian Empire
Lawyers from the Russian Empire
Russian people of World War I
White movement people
Russian All-Military Union members
White Russian emigrants to Yugoslavia
Prisoners and detainees of the Soviet Union
Inmates of Vladimir Central Prison
Writers from Kyiv